In computing, bootcfg is a command on Microsoft Windows NT-based operating systems which acts as a wrapper for editing the boot.ini file.

Overview
The command is used to configure, query, or change Boot.ini file settings. A similar command exists in the Recovery Console for repairing or rebuilding boot configuration files.

Though NTLDR and boot.ini are no longer used to boot Windows Vista and later versions of Windows NT, they ship with the bootcfg utility regardless. This is to handle boot.ini in the case that a multi-boot configuration with previous versions of Windows exists and needs troubleshooting from within the later operating system.

Windows Vista and later versions will warn users who run bootcfg that BCDEdit is the correct command to modify its booting options.

Syntax
The command-syntax is:
 bootcfg <parameter> [arguments...]

Parameters
addsw – Add operating system load options
copy – Make a copy of an existing boot entry
dbg1394 – Configures 1394 port debugging
debug – Add or changes debug settings
default – Specify the default operating system entry
delete – Deletes an operating system entry
ems – Add or change settings for redirection of the Emergency Management Services console
query – Query and displays [boot loader] and [operating systems] section entries
raw – Add operating system load options
rmsw – Remove operating system load options
timeout – Change operating system time-out value

References

Further reading

External links

 bootcfg | Microsoft Docs

Windows administration
Windows commands